Spend the Night is the fifth studio album and major label debut by the American hard rock band The Donnas, released in 2002 on Atlantic Records. It was the band's first charting record on the Billboard 200, peaking at number 62, and features their most successful single, "Take It Off", which peaked at 19 on the Billboard Modern Rock Tracks chart.

In November 2016 Cherry Red Records re-released the album to feature six bonus tracks, which consist of B-sides and songs from previous albums.

As of 2005 it has sold 450,000 units in United States according to Nielsen SoundScan.

Track listing
All songs by Brett Anderson, Torry Castellano, Maya Ford and Allison Robertson.

Personnel
The Donnas
Brett Anderson – vocals
Allison Robertson – guitar, vocals
Maya Ford – bass guitar
Torry Castellano – drums, percussion, vocals

Additional personnel
The Hellacopters – background vocals

Production
Producer: Jason Carmer, Robert Shimp (Record)
Producer: David Anthony, Gloria Gabriel (DVD)
Engineers: Sean Beresford, Jason Carmer, Dime Assistant, Clint Roth, Robert Shimp
Assistant engineers: Jesse Nichols, Michael Rosen
Mixing: Chris Lord-Alge
Mastering: Emily Lazar
Assistant mastering engineer: Sarah Register
Audio supervisor: Scott Smith
A&R: Nick Casinelli, Mary Gormley
Drum technician: Paul Revelli
Art direction: Christina Dittmar
Cover art concept: The Donnas
Artwork: Stephen Stickler
Photography: Stephen Stickler
Cover photo: Stephen Stickler
Direction: Popglory Art
Camera operators: The Donnas, Tim Baker, Jackie Kelso
Animation: Chris Becker
Interviewer: Andy Dick
Interviewee: The Donnas
Model: Davy Newkirk

Charts

In popular culture
 The song "Take It Off" has been featured in the films Dodgeball: A True Underdog Story, The Hangover, and the PlayStation 2 version of Guitar Hero, and as a part of a 3-song downloadable pack via Xbox Live for the Xbox 360 version of Guitar Hero II. It appeared one more time in Guitar Hero Smash Hits. It was also featured in the Birds of Prey episode, "Gladiatrix". It was later released as DLC for Rock Band.
 "Who Invited You" was featured in EA Sports' MVP Baseball 2003, Splashdown: Rides Gone Wild, and True Crime: Streets of LA.

References

External links

The Donnas albums
2002 albums
Atlantic Records albums